Blastobasis gracilis is a moth in the  family Blastobasidae. It was described by Walsingham in 1897. It is found in Grenada.

References

Natural History Museum Lepidoptera generic names catalog

Blastobasis
Moths described in 1897